Song Kang (born April 23, 1994) is a South Korean actor. His notable lead roles in television series include Love Alarm (2019–21), Sweet Home (2020), Navillera (2021), Nevertheless (2021), and Forecasting Love and Weather (2022). He is popularly known as the "Son of Netflix" because most of his series are aired on the platform.

Career

2017–18: Beginnings
Kang made his acting debut with a supporting role in the 2017 romantic comedy television series The Liar and His Lover. The same year, he was cast in the family drama Man in the Kitchen. He also appeared in two music videos: "Sweet Summer Night" by acoustic duo The Ade and "Love Story" by Suran. On July 8, 2017, his agency Namoo Actors organised a fan meeting – "Introduction to Rookies" for Kang alongside Oh Seung-hoon and Lee Yoo-jin. 

Kang hosted the SBS music program Inkigayo from February to October 2018 along with Seventeen's Mingyu and DIA's Jung Chae-yeon. He also joined as a fixed cast member on the variety show Village Survival, the Eight. For the two works, he was nominated for the "Rookie Award" at the 2018 SBS Entertainment Awards. In July 2018, Song marked his big-screen debut with the fantasy film Beautiful Vampire.

2019–present: Rise in popularity and lead roles

In 2019, Kang played the supporting role of Jung Kyung-ho's assistant in tvN fantasy melodrama When the Devil Calls Your Name. He next starred in the Netflix original romantic series Love Alarm, based on the popular webtoon of the same name. Kang was cast in his first main role through auditions out of 900 people; he played the role of a handsome high-school student who falls in love with a girl (Kim So-hyun) who was his best friend's secret crush. Love Alarm was ranked as one of Netflix's top releases of the year and was renewed for a second season. His final appearance that year was in the music video of Vibe's "Call Me Back".

Kang was propelled to stardom in 2020 when he starred in apocalyptic horror Netflix original Sweet Home, based on the eponymous webtoon. He was auditioned for the cast on the recommendation of Love Alarm director to the director of Sweet Home, Lee Eung-bok. His role was Cha Hyun-su, a suicidal high school boy who, along with a group of fellow apartment residents, tries to survive a "monsterization" apocalypse. Critical responses of the series were mixed, but gathered a wide international audience. One month after the release of the series, Variety revealed that it had been viewed by 22 million member households of Netflix. At the 57th Baeksang Arts Awards Kang received a nomination for Best New Actor – Television.

In 2021, he reprised his role as Hwang Sun-oh in the second season of Love Alarm which was released on Netflix on March 12. He next appeared in the tvN series Navillera, adapted from the eponymous webtoon. He played a ballet student who struggles due to unresolved issues about his father and tries to support himself by working as a part-timer. Kang took ballet lessons for six months in order to portray his character. Later the same year, Kang starred in another webtoon adaption Nevertheless, JTBC's romance drama, alongside Han So-hee.

In terms of viewership record, the year 2021 is considered a success for Kang as Sweet Home, Love Alarm and Nevertheless managed to rank as 5th, 6th, and 8th most watched K-dramas in Netflix worldwide, respectively.

In 2022, Kang starred in another JTBC drama, Forecasting Love and Weather, alongside Park Min-young. On March 4, 2022, Kang held a fan meeting to communicate with fans around the world in real time via 'The Swoon', a YouTube channel dedicated to South Korea. In May, it was reported that Kang will hold a fan meeting on June 12, 2022, at the YES24 Live Hall.in November Song has confirmed that the "2023 Song Kang Asia Fan Meeting Tour" will take place in six countries, starting with Seoul, followed by Tokyo, Jakarta, Kuala Lumpur, Singapore and Bangkok, which will take place sometime in 2023.

Filmography

Film

Television series

Web series

Television shows

Web shows

Music video

Awards and nominations

Listicles

Notes

References

External links 

 
 
 
 

1994 births
Living people
21st-century South Korean male actors
South Korean male television actors
South Korean male film actors
South Korean male web series actors
Konkuk University alumni
People from Suwon